The 2011–12 Cymru Alliance season, also known as Huws Gray Alliance for sponsoring purposes, is the 22nd season of the Cymru Alliance, the second-level association football league in north Wales. It began on 12 August 2011 and ended on 21 April 2012. Sixteen teams take part in the league, with Gap Connah's Quay being the defending champions.

The champions are eligible for promotion to the 2012–13 Welsh Premier League, pending a licence application and approval, while the bottom three teams will be relegated to one of the three feeder leagues of the Cymru Alliance.

Teams
No team was either promoted to or relegated from the 2010–11 Welsh Premier League after 2010–11 Cymru Alliance champions Gap Connah's Quay were denied a 2011–12 Premier League licence, with Bala Town therefore being spared of relegation from the highest Welsh league.

Rhydymwyn, Rhayader Town and Welshpool Town were relegated at the end of the 2010–11 season after finishing in the bottom three places of the table. They were replaced by the 2010–11 champions of the three Cymru Alliance feeder leagues, Conwy United (Welsh Alliance League), Llanrhaeadr (Mid Wales League) and Penycae (Welsh National League).

League table

Results

References

External links
 Official site

2011
2
Wales